Tigridia pavonia is a species of flowering plant in the iris family Iridaceae. Common names include jockey's cap lily, Mexican shellflower, peacock flower, tiger iris, and tiger flower. This summer-flowering bulbous herbaceous perennial is widespread across much of Mexico, Guatemala, El Salvador, and Honduras. It is naturalized in Ecuador and Peru.

The leaves are narrow and lance-shaped. The three-petalled blooms occur in a variety of colours with strongly contrasting central markings. They open early in the morning and close before dusk. Blooms are successional throughout summer. Plants bloom in the first year after sowing.

Tigridia pavonia is cultivated as an ornamental plant. It prefers a sheltered position in full sun, in sandy but fertile soil.

The roasted bulbs are edible and have been used by the American Indians and Indigenous peoples of Mexico. It has a chestnut-like flavour.

The aphid Aphis newtoni may be found on this plant.

References

Iridaceae
Flora of Mexico
Flora of Central America
Garden plants
Plants described in 1782
Taxa named by Carl Linnaeus the Younger